Retired from Sad, New Career in Business is the second studio album by Japanese-American musician Mitski. Mitski self-released the project on August 1, 2013 while still a student at SUNY Purchase. The album was her senior project and featured a 60-piece student orchestra. Every song on the album, excluding Square, was accompanied by a music video, with each video playing a part in an ongoing story. In the summer of 2020, album track "Strawberry Blond" gained a resurgence in popularity on the social media app TikTok, specifically in the cottagecore community.

Critical reception
Retired from Sad, New Career in Business received praise for its blend of "out-of-the-norm orchestral sounds with electronics and 'found' sounds". In a career retrospective following her 2018 studio album Be the Cowboy, Jesse Herb of Atwood Magazine said that the album "completely highlights Mitski’s writing growth in just one year, and also her impeccable composition" and that the album "could be in an off-broadway musical." Herb singled out "Shame", "Circle", and "Strawberry Blond" in particular, saying that the latter "feels like a lost Dar Williams record".

Track listing

Personnel 
Credits adapted from Bandcamp. 

 Mitski – songwriting, vocals, drums
 Trevor Fedele – recording engineer 
 Patrick Hyland – recording engineer, mixing engineer, mastering engineer
 Will Prinzi – acoustic guitar, electric guitar, bass
 Mike Rasimas – drums
 Scott Interrante – orchestrations
 Sean Mcverry – gang vocals
 Eli Wolf-Christensen – gang vocals, mandolin
 Kenneth "Kenny" Trotter – violin
 Sarah Wolffe – violin
 Michael Mandrin – violin
 Sophie Dolamore – viola
 Naseer François Ashraf  – viola
 Elise Linder – cello
 Pete Olynciw – upright bass
 Kevin Schmid – upright bass
 Julie Yeaeun Lee – flute
 Andrew Cowie – clarinet, bass clarinet
 John Cummings – trumpet
 Jerome Burns – trumpet, cornet
 Rich Liverano – trombone
 Cristian Uraga – french horn
 Pixel (as Trixie Doll) – cover model

Notes

References

External links
 

2013 albums
Mitski albums
Self-released albums
Orchestral pop albums
Freak folk albums